Darina Hilda Allen (née O'Connell; born 13 June 1948) is an Irish chef, food writer, TV personality and founder of Ballymaloe Cookery School.

Biography

Darina Allen was born in Cullohill, County Laois, the eldest of nine children. The renowned chef Rory O'Connell is her brother. A graduate in hotel management of the Dublin Institute of Technology, she is the author of several successful books on the topic of Irish cuisine. She is a leader of the Slow Food movement in Ireland and instrumental in establishing a network of farmers' markets in the Cork area. In the 1960s she was sous-chef at Ballymaloe House and started giving courses in cooking. Later she moved the cookery classes to Kinoith under the name of Ballymaloe Cookery School. She married Tim Allen, son of Myrtle Allen and Ivan Allen, and now lives on her organic farm, Kinoith, in Shanagarry. Allen has been voted cooking teacher of the year by the International Association of Culinary Professionals. She is owner of Ballymaloe Cookery School in Shanagarry, County Cork, Ireland. The school is situated on an organically run farm.

Allen was a founder of some of the first Farmers' Markets in Ireland and continues to be involved in helping set up new markets.. She is currently chair of the Midleton Farmers' Market.

Darina Allen's husband, Tim Allen set up the Ballymaloe Cookery School with Darina. In January 2003 he pleaded guilty to possessing 977 pornographic images of children. He was caught as part of the Gardaí's Operation Amethyst, which tracked internet users who paid for child pornography with credit cards. Tim Allen was sentenced to community service and placed on the sex offenders register after offering to pay €40,000 to a children's charity in India. Following Allen's conviction, the Ballymaloe cookery school announced that he would no longer be involved in the business. However, he remains involved.

Memberships
Member of Taste Council of Irish Food Board, Chair of Artisan Food Forum of Food Safety Authority of Ireland, Food Safety Consultative Council of Ireland, Trustee of Irish Organic Centre, Patron of Irish Seedsavers.

Member of Eurotoques (European Association of Chefs), IWF (International Women's Federation), Network Ireland, Guild of Foodwriters in UK and Ireland, International SLOW Movement, Bread Bakers Guild of America, IACP (International Association of Culinary Professionals – Darina Allen is a Certified Culinary Professional and Teacher and the school is accredited by IACP).

Councillor for Ireland in Slow Food Movement and President of East Cork Convivium of Slow Food.

Awards and honours
2013 Irish Book Awards (Cookbook of the Year) for 30 Years of Ballymaloe
2005 Cooking Teacher of the Year Award from IACP
2003 Honorary Degree from University of Ulster
2001 Veuve Clicquot Business Woman of the Year
2000 Waterford Wedgwood Hospitality Award
1996 Langhe Ceretto Prize
1993 Laois Person of the Year
1992 Gilbeys Gold Medal for Catering Excellence jointly with Myrtle Allen
Fellow of Irish Hotel and Catering Institute

Bibliography 
She has written a number of cookery books including:
Simply Delicious
Simply Delicious Christmas
Simply Delicious in France and Italy
Simply Delicious Fish
Simply Delicious Versatile Vegetables
Simply Delicious Meals in Minutes
A Year at Ballymaloe Cookery School
Forgotten Skills of Cooking
 Irish Traditional Cooking. Gill & Macmillan (Britain: Kyle Cathie)

References

External links
Ballymaloe Cookery School Homepage
 

Irish television personalities
Living people
1948 births
People from County Laois
Alumni of Dublin Institute of Technology
Irish chefs
Irish television chefs